French Badminton Federation (FFBaD) is the national governing body for the sport of badminton in France. As of 2017, it has more than 191,600 registered players across the country and 1,977 affiliated badminton clubs.

History
The original federation was founded in 1930, but it was dissolved in 1941 and merged as part of French Tennis Federation during the Vichy regime. It was not until 1979 when a group of badminton enthusiasts decided to create a new federation which later became the current form of the organization.

Tournaments
 French Open, an annual open tournament that attracts the world's elite players.
 Orleans Masters (formerly Orléans International), an annual tournament held in Orléans first started in 2012.
 Le Volant d'Or de Toulouse, an annual tournament held in Toulouse which was discontinued after 2009.

References

National members of the Badminton World Federation
Badminton in France
Badminton
1979 establishments in France